Bishop Louis Reicher Catholic School is a private Catholic Parish school located in Waco, Texas. It is situated halfway between Dallas and Austin. Bishop Reicher was founded in 1954 by the Diocese of Austin. Reicher academics include curriculum offering of Advanced Placement, Dual Credit, and Honor courses.

"St. Louis Reicher Catholic School educates each student in spirit, mind and body by fostering personal excellence within the Catholic tradition."

Athletics
There is a wide range of sports and athletics programs at Reicher, such as baseball, basketball, cross country, football, golf, powerlifting, soccer, softball, track, and volleyball.

The school has amassed many championship titles, with 9 state titles in football, 6 in boys soccer, 5 in girls softball, 4 in powerlifting with 1 national title, 4 in boys track, 3 in girls track, 3 in boys baseball, 2 in girls dance, 1 in boys basketball, and many more titles in other programs.

The football program was considered a Texas powerhouse in the 2000s under head coach Mark Waggoner, with 1 state title in 2004 and 3 consecutive state titles in 2007, 2008, and 2009. The 2009-2010 season was the most acclaimed for the Cougars, being ranked within the top 3,000 high school football programs in the country, within the top 300 high school football programs in Texas, number 1 in TAPPS Division 3,  and number 8 in TAPPS high school football overall.

Safety Ross Rasner (Class of 2009) would be the only student athlete in Reicher history to make it to the NFL, with a brief stint playing for the Denver Broncos after playing for the Arkansas Razorbacks in college. Baseball player Joseph Dvorsky (Class of 2006) was drafted by the White Sox in the 2011 MLB Draft.

References

External links
Official Website
Roman Catholic Diocese of Austin

Catholic secondary schools in Texas
Educational institutions established in 1954
High schools in Waco, Texas
Schools in McLennan County, Texas
High schools in Central Texas
Private K-12 schools in Texas
1954 establishments in Texas